Sheikh Abdul Aziz bin Nasser al-Thani (Arabic: عبد العزيز بن ناصر آل ثاني) is a Qatari businessman and member of the ruling al-Thani family.

Career

Al-Thani serves as deputy chairman of the Business Trading Company (BTC), a development and investment company that prides itself on close connections to the Qatari state. Established in 1997 in Doha, the multimillion-dollar firm deals primarily with the development of shopping malls and leisure-centers, such as Landmark Mall and Villaggio Mall. BTC’s chairman is Abdulaziz bin Mohammed al-Rabban.

Controversies

On the morning of May 28, 2012 a fire broke out in the Nike Store of the Villaggio Mall (of which BTC is the developer). The ensuing blaze killed 19 people, two of which were firefighters, and injured 17. Of the 19 victims, 13 were young children who had been trapped in the Gympanzee daycare center. As a result, Abdulaziz al-Rabban was tried and charged, along with several mall staff, with involuntary manslaughter and given the maximum allowable sentence of 6 years. Rabban’s conviction was overturned by Qatar’s Appeal Court in a 2015 decision that has been widely criticized.

References

Living people
Abdul Aziz bin Nasser
Qatari businesspeople
Year of birth missing (living people)